Miramax, LLC, also known as Miramax Films, is an American film and television production and distribution company founded on December 19, 1979, by Harvey and Bob Weinstein, and based in Los Angeles, California.

It was a leading producer and distributor of independent films until it became the first company acquired by The Walt Disney Company on June 30, 1993. In 2010, Disney sold it to Filmyard Holdings, a joint venture of Colony NorthStar, Tutor-Saliba Corporation, and Qatar Investment Authority. In March 2016, the company was sold to the beIN Media Group, which later sold a 49% stake to ViacomCBS (now Paramount Global). That sale was completed in April 2020, placing Miramax under the umbrella of its film division, Paramount Pictures.

History

Independent era (1979–1993) 
The company was founded by the Weinstein brothers, Harvey and Bob, along with executive Corky Burger in Buffalo, New York, in 1979, and was named by combining the first names of their parents, Miriam and Max. It was created to distribute independent films deemed commercially unfeasible by the major studios.

The company's first major success came when the Weinsteins teamed up with British producer Martin Lewis and acquired the U.S. rights to two concert films Lewis had produced of benefit shows for human rights organization Amnesty International. The Weinsteins worked with Lewis to distill the two films into one film for the American marketplace. The resulting film, the American version of The Secret Policeman's Other Ball, was a successful release for Miramax in the summer of 1982. This release presaged a modus operandi that the company would undertake later in the 1980s of acquiring films from international filmmakers and reworking them to suit American sensibilities and audiences. In its early years, Miramax had to focus primarily as a catalyst for music and decided to do a licensing agreement with Thorn EMI Video, in order to release several of Miramax's early films.

Among the company's other breakthrough films as distributors in the late 1980s and early 1990s were Pulp Fiction, Scandal, Sex, Lies, and Videotape, Tie Me Up! Tie Me Down!, The Crying Game, and Clerks. The company also made films such as Flirting with Disaster, Heavenly Creatures, and Shakespeare in Love.

Miramax acquired and/or produced many other films that did well financially. The company became one of the leaders of the independent film boom of the 1990s. Miramax produced or distributed seven films with box office grosses totaling more than $100 million; its most successful title, Chicago, earned more than $300 million worldwide.

The company was also successful in securing Academy Award nominations for its releases, many of which resulted in Oscar wins.

Disney era (1993–2010) 
On June 30, 1993, The Walt Disney Company purchased Miramax for $60 million and assumed all of the company's debt, which was more than $40 million. The acquisition gave Disney entry to the independent film market. Harvey and Bob Weinstein continued to operate Miramax until they left the company on September 30, 2005. During their tenure, the Weinstein brothers ran Miramax independently of other Disney subsidiaries, and as a result had more autonomy than the other Disney-owned companies. Disney, however, had the final say on what Miramax could release (for example, Disney had banned Miramax from releasing Kids, Dogma and Fahrenheit 9/11). Disney's Buena Vista Home Entertainment division released Miramax output on VHS, DVD and Blu-ray Disc in some countries, including the U.S.; elsewhere, the overall distribution of Miramax's output was passed to the regional licensees of Miramax International, a distribution arm of Miramax that was fully autonomous from Disney's own distribution operations.

With a more stable budget, Miramax began moving beyond acquisitions and distribution and into film productions. Until September 30, 2005, the company also operated the label Dimension Films, which was solely founded by Bob to specialize in teen, horror, and other genre films, and created the Scream and Scary Movie film franchises. Harvey funded larger projects and from up and coming directors including Robert Rodriguez, Gus Van Sant and Quentin Tarantino. Some of the films earned Oscars.

In 1997, Miramax joined Peter Jackson as a primary financial backer in attempting to get the Lord of the Rings films produced. Disney disliked the cost of a two-parter, requesting that it be produced as a single film. Jackson and Saul Zaentz rejected Disney's request and looked for another studio or financier. Thus, Miramax sold the rights for The Lord of the Rings and The Hobbit to New Line Cinema in August 1998 for about $12 million, which led The Lord of the Rings to be produced as a trilogy. Miramax retained a 5% stake in the films' gross and then gave 2.5% to the Weinsteins.

Through Miramax, Harvey founded Talk magazine with Tina Brown in 1998 (it shut down in 2002), albeit without the approval of then-Disney chief Michael Eisner, which upset Eisner. Also that year, 30 former employees filed suit over unpaid overtime wages.

By 2003, Miramax was less operative in the independent film market and became more of a mini-major as the company only acquired 3 films while producing Cold Mountain for $80 million. The Weinsteins claimed the company was profitable, but Walt Disney Co. president Robert Iger indicated in June 2004 that they were not properly accounting for "account standard overhead, distribution fees, bonuses that we pay Harvey and Bob. Nor are they applying current accounting rules."

After extensive negotiations and much media and industry speculation, on March 30, 2005, Disney and the Weinsteins announced that they would not renew their contractual relationship when their existing agreements expired at the end of September 2005. The primary source of dispute was over distribution of Fahrenheit 9/11 by Michael Moore. Disney's film studio consortium, Buena Vista Motion Pictures Group, assumed control of Miramax, which was projected to have a smaller annual production budget. The Weinsteins started a new film production company called The Weinstein Company (TWC), and took the Dimension Films label with them. The Miramax name remained with the film studio owned by Disney. Production at Miramax was taken over by Daniel Battsek, who had been head of Buena Vista International in the UK. Battsek refocused Miramax to produce films of high quality but low budget. Maple Pictures held the rights to distribute Miramax films in Canada from 2008 up until August 10, 2011, when Maple Pictures was acquired by Alliance Films.

On October 3, 2009, Disney announced that the staff of Miramax was to be reduced by 70%, and the number of releases would be reduced by half to just three films per year. The label's marketing, distribution and administrative functions, which had operated independently, would be folded into the parent studio in Burbank. The move became effective in January 2010. On October 30, 2009, Disney announced the resignation of Daniel Battsek as President of Miramax Films, effective when the transition from the studio in New York to Burbank was completed. The company merged its operations with The Walt Disney Studios on January 28, 2010, shutting down Miramax's separate New York and Los Angeles offices.

Though Disney Studio Chairman Dick Cook was a staunch supporter of Miramax, the brand was less of a priority for CEO Bob Iger, whose strategy was to focus on Disney's branded mass entertainment that could be exploited across Disney's theme parks, television and consumer products. Following Disney's $4 billion acquisition of Marvel Entertainment in 2009, Cook was succeeded by Rich Ross. As a result, Miramax was relegated to the status of distribution label within the Walt Disney Company. The company confirmed that it was looking into selling the Miramax label on February 9, 2010, with Bob Iger explaining "We determined that continuing to invest in new Miramax movies wasn't necessarily a core strategy of ours".

Other companies and Post-Disney ownership era (2010–2019) 

On December 3, 2010, Disney closed the sale of Miramax for US$663 million to Filmyard Holdings, an investment group and joint venture of Colony NorthStar, Tutor-Saliba Corporation, and Qatar Investment Authority. The sale included 700 film titles, books, development projects, and the "Miramax" name. Mike Lang, the former News Corporation business development executive who was selected as the CEO of Miramax, indicated that the company would focus on their existing library, though they would continue making original content.

After the sale was closed, some films already developed at Miramax, including The Tempest and Gnomeo & Juliet, were eventually released by Disney under its Touchstone Pictures banner, and theatrical distribution of Don't Be Afraid of the Dark and The Debt were shifted to FilmDistrict and Focus Features respectively.

On December 16, 2013, Miramax entered into a deal with Harvey and Bob Weinstein's The Weinstein Company to develop and distribute select derivative works of films from the former studio. Sequels, television series, or stage productions of titles such as Rounders and Shakespeare in Love were among the projects said to be part of this agreement.

On July 17, 2015, Qatar and Colony NorthStar put Miramax up for sale for an offer of $1 billion. Harvey and Bob Weinstein had reportedly regained interest in reacquiring the studio via TWC in September. On March 2, 2016, Miramax was sold to beIN Media Group, a spinoff of Al Jazeera Media Network (which formerly owned its namesake beIN Sports).

On a July 21, 2016 interview, Harvey Weinstein stated that he was still interested in combining TWC's film library with Miramax's, after the acquisition of the latter by beIN.

After Miramax's founder Harvey Weinstein was accused of sexual assault in October 2017, Miramax became one of 60 parties bidding on The Weinstein Company on January 16, 2018. On April 27, Miramax and Lantern Capital emerged as the strongest contenders to acquire TWC's assets. Ultimately, it was Lantern that acquired TWC's library.

On June 7, 2019, beIN began the process of selling approximately 50% of Miramax in an effort to offer it for growth. Lionsgate (which distributed Miramax's titles on home video), Spyglass Media Group (owners of the Weinstein Company library, inherited via their deal with Lantern) and Viacom (Paramount's parent company who re-merged with CBS Corporation on December 4, 2019, to form ViacomCBS) were seen as the leading contenders to acquire a stake in the company. By August 19, 2019, Lionsgate and Viacom were the only contenders, as Spyglass Media Group dropped out of contention. On September 11, 2019, it was announced Lionsgate had dropped their bid, making Viacom the only bidder for the stake in Miramax. On November 8, 2019, Viacom exited the negotiations to acquire them. After merging with CBS Corporation to become ViacomCBS, the combined firm resumed talks with Miramax.

ViacomCBS/Paramount Global era (2019–present) 
On December 20, 2019, ViacomCBS (now known as Paramount Global) announced it would acquire a 49% stake in Miramax for at least $375 million, with Paramount Pictures gaining exclusive worldwide distribution rights to its library. Paramount Pictures and Miramax will also co-produce new content based on titles from the library. The deal officially closed on April 3, 2020.

On June 24, 2020, Miramax and ViacomCBS announced their first co-production, The Turkish Detective, a television series based on the Cetin Ikmen novels by Barbara Nadel.

Criticism 
The company was criticized for delaying or withholding release of Asian films to which it acquires the U.S. distribution rights while trying to bar retailers from legally exporting authentic DVDs of the films.

In a 2005 interview, Japanese director Hayao Miyazaki related that Harvey Weinstein aggressively sought a large number of edits to Miyazaki's anime film Princess Mononoke for the film's U.S. release. Miyazaki stated that his producer sent Weinstein a samurai sword with the message "No cuts" attached to the blade. According to Miyazaki, the film was released without the edits Weinstein wanted. Weinstein has always insisted that such editing is done in the interest of creating the most financially viable film. "I'm not cutting for fun," Weinstein said in an interview. "I'm cutting for the shit to work. All my life I served one master — the film. I love movies."

Divisions

Miramax Family & Animation 

Miramax Family & Miramax Animation (also known as Miramax Family Films) are the family divisions of Miramax Films; originally founded as one singular company in 1991. The company would shut down in 2006. On March 18, 2019, Miramax revived its family and animation division, with both being founded as separate divisions within the company.

Michael Lachance, who had previously developed projects at DreamWorks Animation and Sony Pictures Animation, was named the division's executive vice president.

Filmography

Film series 

Films and TV shows distributed by Miramax Family and Miramax Animation are listed here:

 Freddie as F.R.O.7 (1992)
 Into the West (1993)
 Tom and Jerry: The Movie (1993) (US theatrical distribution only)
 Little Buddha (1994)
 The Thief and the Cobbler (1995) (originally released in cinemas as Arabian Knight)
 Gordy (1995)
 The NeverEnding Story III: Escape from Fantasia (1996) (US release only; distributed internationally by Warner Bros. Family Entertainment)
 Hugo the Movie Star (1996)
 Microcosmos (1996)
 How the Toys Saved Christmas (1997)
 The Phoenix and the Carpet (1997)
 The Animal Train (1998)
 Hugo the Movie Star 2 (1998)
 Wide Awake (1998)
 The Mighty (1998)
 The Bear (1998)
 Children of Heaven (1999)
 Flipper and Lopaka (1999–2005)
 Princess Mononoke (2000) (North American distribution only)
 Asterix & Obelix Take On Caesar (2000)
 Clerks Uncensored (2001)
 On the Line (2001)
 The Adventures of Tom Thumb and Thumbelina (2002)
 Asterix & Obelix: Mission Cleopatra (2002)
 The Best of Tokyo Pig (2002)
 Pokémon 4Ever: Celebi – Voice of the Forest (2002)
 Pinocchio (2002)
 Warriors of Virtue: The Return to Tao (2002)
 Pokémon Heroes: The Movie – Latios & Latias (2003)
 A Wrinkle in Time (2003)
 Bionicle: The Movie – Mask of Light (2003)
 MXP: Most Extreme Primate (2003)
 Shaolin Soccer (2004)
 Ella Enchanted (2004)
 Chestnut: Hero of Central Park (2004) (DVD only)
 Pokémon: Jirachi – Wish Maker (2004)
 Bionicle 2: Legends of Metru Nui (2004)
 Finding Neverland (2004)
 In Search of Santa (2004)
 Paul McCartney: Music & Animation (2004)
 Beyblade: The Movie – Fierce Battle (2005)
 Bionicle 3: Web of Shadows (2005)
 My Scene Goes Hollywood: The Movie (2005)
 Pokémon: Destiny Deoxys (2005)
 Spymate (2006)

Miramax Television 

Miramax Television is the television production division founded in 1987, assigned to producing television shows based on the existing Miramax film library and original concepts. Its projects include the following:

Notes

References

Further reading 
 Down and Dirty Pictures: Miramax, Sundance, and the Rise of Independent Film by Peter Biskind (Simon & Schuster, 2004)

External links 

 

 
American companies established in 1979
BeIN Media Group
Paramount Pictures
Joint ventures
Film distributors of the United States
Film production companies of the United States
Television production companies of the United States
Paramount Television
Entertainment companies based in California
Companies based in Los Angeles
Mass media companies established in 1979
1979 establishments in New York (state)
Former subsidiaries of The Walt Disney Company
American independent film studios
1993 mergers and acquisitions
2010 mergers and acquisitions
2016 mergers and acquisitions
2020 mergers and acquisitions
Former Viacom subsidiaries
Former Lionsgate subsidiaries
Harvey Weinstein
International sales agents